The 2006–07 A1 Grand Prix season was the second season for the A1 Grand Prix series. 
It began on 1 October 2006, at Circuit Park Zandvoort, and the season ended at Brands Hatch on 29 April 2007. A1 Team Germany won it with 128 points, 35 points lead ahead Team New Zealand.

Teams
24 teams, each representing a different country, signed up for the second A1 Grand Prix season. All teams and drivers competed in Zytek-powered, Cooper Avon-shod and Lola A1GP chassis. The following teams competed in the 2006–07 championship:

3 A1GP Teams did not participate in all races.
 A1 Team Greece not participate from the Beijing race.
 A1 Team Singapore has not raced in all 3 last races allegedly due to an injury suffered by their one and only driver, Christian Murchison, in the South African leg of the season.
 A1 Team Portugal start 2006–07 A1 Grand Prix season at South African race.

Jennifer Murray, from South Africa was the first ever woman to enter in an A1 Grand Prix weekend. She drove in the rookie session of her home race in Durban round.

Races
The second A1 Grand Prix season is scheduled to consist of 11 races, held in 10 different countries. Each race is to be run over a three-day weekend, including a practice session on each of Friday and Saturday before a qualifying session on Saturday, and then two races on Sunday.

There are some changes in weekend program for second season:
 Gap between races will be increased to almost three and half hours.
 Sprint race will be about 20 minutes and Feature race about 70 minutes.
 Only top six nations score points in sprint race.

A 12th race had been scheduled to have been held in Brazil; however, on 17 January 2007 the A1GP organisation announced that as a result of a delay in obtaining a local terrestrial television agreement then the event would be cancelled.

Standings

Notable 2006–07 season happenings

Beijing Incident

The first Chinese round of the 2006/07 A1GP took place on the streets of Beijing. However, the tight hairpin at the end of the backstraight was too tight for the cars to negotiate safely due to a 180 degree left turn. Cars were running wide and stopping mid corner, therefore the sessions were red flagged.

A shorter circuit was created, creating a less tight hairpin halfway up the straight, bypassing most of the old straight. This corner was still not perfect as drivers ran wide despite the corner being wider, and had to avoid the pitlane entry barrier. It had to suffice, though, because otherwise the race would have to be cancelled.

However, another problem arose in qualifying, when manhole covers on the roads were coming undone due to the racing cars' high downforce and low center of gravity. Grid positions were decided based on practice times. Some advertising banners also came loose around the circuit.

It was announced the races would start behind the safety car as the first corner was also deemed unsafe.

Both races were uneventful, particularly the Sprint Race which took place almost entirely behind the safety car after course officials failed to remove a single spun car in a timely fashion.

April Fools' hoax 
On 1 April 2006, during the penultimate round of the 2005–06 A1 Grand Prix season in Shanghai, a fake timetable of the 2006–2007 season was published. This schedule included a night time race in Sápmi, an A1GP USA race in Baghdad, a race in Middle-earth at 'The Ring', a Venice Street Race as well as a Tibetan hill climb. In addition, it outlined special regulations, such as requiring only the Cornettos be catered for the Venice race, that "cars will arrive flatpacked for the IKEA Cup race in Narnia, so extra time will be required for their assembly", and that for the hill climb, half the cars will start from the top, and half will start from the bottom. A race in South Los Angeles was to have drive-by penalties.

References

External links

 Official season standings and results at results.a1gp.com

 
A1 Grand Prix
A1 Grand Prix
A1 Grand Prix
A1 Grand Prix